The European Journal of Political Economy is a quarterly peer-reviewed academic journal covering research on economic phenomena, including collective decision making, political behavior, and the role of institutions. The editors-in-chief are Toke Aidt (University of Cambridge), Vincenzo Galasso (Bocconi University), Thomas Stratmann (George Mason University), and Jan-Egbert Sturm (ETH Zurich).

Abstracting and indexing 
The journal is abstracted and indexed in the Social Sciences Citation Index. According to the Journal Citation Reports, the journal has a 2015 impact factor of 1.248, ranking it 50th out of 161 journals in the category "Political Science".

References

External links 
 

Elsevier academic journals
English-language journals
Political science journals
Publications established in 1985
Quarterly journals